Édifice André-Laurendeau is an eleven-storey office tower located at 1050, rue des Parlementaires in Quebec City, Quebec, Canada. The Beaux-Arts structure was built between 1935 and 1937 by Lacroix, Drouin and Bergeron and is the property of the Government of Quebec. In 1980 it was named in honour of journalist and politician André Laurendeau.

Office of the Lieutenant Governor of Quebec
After the fire at Bois de Coulonge in 1966, the office of the Lieutenant Governor of Quebec was moved to Édifice André-Laurendeau where he or she holds an office and a suite of rooms for entertaining. Inside are reception rooms, offices and support facilities. The royal suite is the site of swearing-in ceremonies for Cabinet ministers, where Royal Assent is granted, and where the Lieutenant Governor receives his or her premier. Whenever the sovereign and/or other members of the Royal Family are in the provincial capital, he or she resides at a hotel.

References

External links
 Édifice André-Laurendeau
 Government of the Province of Quebec, Canada

Buildings and structures in Quebec City
Quebec government buildings